Ivelet is a hamlet in the Yorkshire Dales, North Yorkshire, England about a mile west of Gunnerside in Swaledale.

Ivelet Bridge crosses the River Swale near Ivelet. Dating from the late 16th century, the bridge has been designated a Grade II* listed structure.

A coffin stone is set into the verge on the north side of the bridge for pall bearers to rest with a coffin on their way from Muker to the church at Grinton. The coffin stone is itself a Grade II structure.

The bridge is featured in the British television series All Creatures Great and Small, in the episode "Call of the Wild".

References

External links

Villages in North Yorkshire
Swaledale